Syringofibroadenoma is a cutaneous condition characterized by a hyperkeratotic nodule or plaque involving the extremities.

It is considered of eccrine origin.

See also 
 Syringadenoma papilliferum
 Skin lesion

References

External links 

Epidermal nevi, neoplasms, and cysts